Paint Township is one of the sixteen townships of Ross County, Ohio, United States.  The 2000 census found 1,169 people in the township.

Geography
Located in the southwestern part of the county, it borders the following townships:
Buckskin Township - north
Twin Township - northeast
Paxton Township - south
Paint Township, Highland County - southwest
Madison Township, Highland County - northwest

No municipalities are located in Paint Township.

Name and history
Paint Township takes its name from Paint Creek. It is one of six Paint Townships statewide.

Government
The township is governed by a three-member board of trustees, who are elected in November of odd-numbered years to a four-year term beginning on the following January 1. Two are elected in the year after the presidential election and one is elected in the year before it. There is also an elected township fiscal officer, who serves a four-year term beginning on April 1 of the year after the election, which is held in November of the year before the presidential election. Vacancies in the fiscal officership or on the board of trustees are filled by the remaining trustees.

References

External links
County website

Townships in Ross County, Ohio
Townships in Ohio